In rhetoric, parechesis is the repetition of the same sound in several words in close succession. 

An example of a parechesis is: "He persuades the Pithian." Hermogenes of Tarsus discusses parechesis in his work On the invention of arguments (Περὶ εὑρέσεως). Alliteration (initial rhyme) is a special case of parechesis. 

It is related to paronomasia.

References

Literature
 

Rhetoric
Figures of speech